In the Hive is a 2012 drama film starring Michael Clarke Duncan (in his first posthumous release following his death earlier that year), Vivica A. Fox, and Jonathan McDaniel. It was directed by Robert Townsend and released in the USA on December 14, 2012.

Cast
Jonathan McDaniel as Xtra Keys
Loretta Devine as Mrs. Inez
Michael Clarke Duncan as Mr. Hollis
Vivica A. Fox as Billie

Accolades
Loretta Devine was nominated for the award for Best Actress in a Motion Picture at the 2013 NAACP Image Awards for her role in In the Hive.

References

External links

2012 films
American drama films
Films directed by Robert Townsend
2012 drama films
Hood films
2010s English-language films
2010s American films